The 1987–88 Phoenix Suns season was the 19th season for the Phoenix Suns of the National Basketball Association. The team was led by new head coach John Wetzel. Having missed the playoffs in each of the last two seasons, Suns management made a midseason trade with Cleveland in attempt to return the Suns to postseason play. The trade would in part send All-Star Larry Nance in exchange for rookie Kevin Johnson. All home games were played at Arizona Veterans Memorial Coliseum.

Despite Nance's quality play (he was leading the Suns in scoring with 21 points and 10 rebounds per game), Suns director of personnel, Cotton Fitzsimmons, stated the reason for the trade. "It's obvious we are not happy with our current record and we are not happy with our record over the last few seasons. We talked to a lot of teams about Nance. We felt it (the trade with Cleveland) was the best deal for us in regard to the youth of the players and draft choices involved." On February 25, the 29-year-old Nance, along with Mike Sanders and a 1988 draft first round pick, were sent to Cleveland in exchange for Johnson, Tyrone Corbin, Mark West, 1988 draft first and second round picks, and a 1989 second round pick (the 1988 draft first rounder would turn out to be Dan Majerle). On the day of the trade, the Suns beat Cleveland (none of the players involved in the trade recorded any minutes). The Suns would, however, lose their next nine games in a row. They finished fourth in the Pacific Division with a 28–54 record.

Offseason

NBA Draft

The Suns finished the 1986–87 season with the seventh worst record in the league, but managed to secure the second pick in the 1987 draft through the Draft Lottery. They lost the first pick to the San Antonio Spurs, who selected future Hall of Fame center David Robinson. With the second pick the Suns selected forward/center Armon Gilliam from UNLV. Gilliam averaged 17.3 points and 8.3 rebounds per game in three years with the Runnin' Rebels. In his senior year, he led the team to a 37–2 record while averaging 23.2 points and 9.3 rebounds per game. On October 8, the Suns signed Gilliam to an undisclosed contract, which general manager Jerry Colangelo stated was "for a long period of time", and was "the largest contract ever signed by a rookie with the Phoenix Suns." Gilliam would play part of three seasons with the Suns, averaging 14.7 points and 7.2 rebounds in 145 games, before being traded to the Charlotte Hornets in December 1989.

The Suns traded the 30th pick to the Portland Trail Blazers in 1985. With the pick the Blazers would select forward Nikita Wilson. The Suns acquired the 46th pick from a trade with the Detroit Pistons in 1983. With the pick they would select guard Bruce Dalrymple from Georgia Tech. On October 3, Dalrymple was signed to a one-year contract, but was waived on October 13 before ever playing for the franchise.

The Suns used their third-round pick to select forward Winston Crite from Texas A&M. Crite averaged 12.8 points and 7.4 rebounds per game in four years with the Aggies. Crite would play part of two seasons with the Suns, averaging 2.8 points and 2.1 rebounds in 31 games, before being waived in December 1988.

Drug scandal
On April 17, 1987, the Maricopa County attorney's office announced indictments against 13 individuals in relation to a cocaine-trafficking investigation. The indictees included Suns players James Edwards, Jay Humphries and Grant Gondrezick, and former players Garfield Heard and Mike Bratz. Edwards, Gondrezick and Bratz were charged with three counts of conspiracy to traffic in or possess a narcotic drug, while Humphries and Heard were charged with one count. A number of other current or former Suns players (Walter Davis, William Bedford, Alvin Scott, Johnny High, Don Buse and Curtis Perry) were named in the indictments but not charged. Other indictees were: Terrence Patrick Kelly, a waiter at Avanti's restaurant in Phoenix; Wynn and Kim Lesure, local businessmen; James Jordan, manager of Malarkey's nightclub in Phoenix; Joseph Beninato, a team photographer; Ramon Vives, owner of Avanti's restaurants in Phoenix and Scottsdale; Kevin Merriweather, roommate of Suns' center William Bedford; and an undisclosed team ticket taker.

The investigation began as a gambling probe in February 1987. While at Malarkey's night club on February 21, a group including James Edwards and two other NBA players allegedly claimed that that night's Suns-Bucks game (a 115–107 Milwaukee victory) would not exceed 226 points. No further evidence was cited and no mention of gambling was made in the indictments. The drug charges were in part based on testimony from Suns star Walter Davis, who was subpoenaed in March and offered immunity in exchange for testimony. Davis stated that he first used cocaine with then-teammate Garfield Heard during the 1978–79 season, and admitted to using the drug with multiple teammates. Davis had first admitted to his drug problem in December 1985 when he left the team mid-season to enter a drug rehabilitation program. Upon news of the indictments, Davis was suspended and re-entered a drug rehab program. Suns rookie center William Bedford was also granted immunity in exchange for testimony.

The story, dubbed "Waltergate", received nationwide news coverage and damaged the team's reputation. General manager Jerry Colangelo stated, "We got crucified. We were tried, convicted and hung in 72 hours." The prosecution started falling apart in July. Davis' initial questioning did not include dates, locations and other details. When questioned in regards to the details, Davis could not provide them. No defendant in the case went to trial. Edwards and Humphries were required to join a drug counseling program. Gondrezick pleaded guilty to tampering with a witness and received three-years of probation. Terrence Patrick Kelly pleaded guilty to one count of conspiring to sell a narcotic drug and was sentenced to 30 days in jail and five-years of probation. Wynn Lesure pleaded no contest to conspiracy to possess a narcotic drug and received three-years of probation. All other charges were dismissed.

Death of Nick Vanos
On August 16, 1987, Suns center Nick Vanos and his fiancée Carolyn Cohen were among 156 killed in the Northwest Airlines Flight 255 crash. Vanos and Cohen, who had spent four days on vacation in Michigan, were returning to Phoenix when the flight crashed after takeoff due to pilot error. Separate lawsuits were filed against Northwest Airlines by the Suns and Vanos' parents. The team filed a property damage suit against the airline, due to the three years remaining on Vanos' five-year contract, claiming the center to be "irreplaceable". Nick's parents, Peter and Josie, filed a wrongful death suit seeking $13.85 million in damages.

Vanos had spent most of his two seasons as a backup center. Appearing in 11 games his rookie season, Vanos averaged 4.9 points and 5.5 rebounds per game. Through 57 games in his sophomore season, he averaged 2.9 points and 3.2 rebounds per game. Vanos' role would increase late in the season due to injuries to centers James Edwards and William Bedford. He would start the final 10 games of the season, during which the team would go 9–1. His production jumped to 7.0 points, 7.8 rebounds and 1.9 assists per game during the stretch. His promising developments would lead the Suns to trade Bedford, their number one pick in the 1986 Draft, to the Detroit Pistons the day before the 1987 Draft. With their longtime center Alvan Adams nearing retirement, and with the oft-injured Edwards facing trial on cocaine conspiracy charges, Vanos was expected to be the team's starting center to start the 1987–88 season.

The 7'2", 260 pound left-hander had become a cult favorite with Suns fan. He had developed a 145-member fan club, which sold "Let Nick Play" T-shirts. The Suns dedicated the 1987–88 season to his memory, and the players wore a black #30 patch on their jerseys throughout the year.

Another Sun's player caught up in the drug scandal, Johnny High, died after crashing his car, at a high speed, into a freeway underpass

Franchise sold

On October 14, 1987, a group headed by Suns general manager and vice president Jerry Colangelo purchased the franchise from owners Richard Bloch, Donald Pitt and Don Diamond for a then-record $44.5 million. Colangelo headed JDM Sports Inc., the general partnership group that owned a controlling interest of the franchise. 10 other limited partners assisted the purchase, including the Greyhound Corporation, the El Dorado Investment Company, and the Phoenix General Basketball Partnership group, which included Suns legend and former interim coach Dick Van Arsdale, team physician Paul Steingard, team orthopedist Richard Emerson, and team podiatrist Michael Kates. Colangelo assumed the role of chief executive officer and team president. Van Arsdale replaced Colangelo as vice president.

In the wake of the damaging drug scandal, Bloch, Pitt and Diamond were prepared to sell the team. Colangelo feared potential buyers planned to relocate the franchise to another city. The sale was finalized on October 16, just before the October 19 "Black Monday" stock market crash. Colangelo later stated that if the deal had not been completed prior, it would not have happened, and that the team likely would've been sold and relocated.

Free agency
On June 11, the Suns signed free agent guard Joe Ward, forward Bill Martin and guard Victor Fleming. Ward, the Suns second-round pick in 1986, had been the team's final preseason cut the previous season. Ward was again cut before the season. Martin had previously played for the Indiana Pacers and New York Knicks in between stints with the CBA. Martin appeared in 10 games with the Suns before being waived on December 26. Fleming, the brother of Vern Fleming, was waived on October 19, re-signed on October 21, and waived again on November 1.

In early October, the Suns signed free agent forward Jeff Cook, and centers Greg Spurling and Ozell Jones. Cook had previously played with the franchise from 1979 to 1983, and had just returned from a stint in Italy before re-signing with Suns. He would appear in just 33 games and spend much of the season on the injured list. Spurling was waived on October 21, while Jones was waived on November 1. On October 20, the Suns signed restricted free agent center Alton Lister to a four-year offer sheet worth $3.5 million. The SuperSonics matched the offer, keeping him in Seattle.

Roster
{| class="toccolours" style="font-size: 85%; width: 100%;"
|-
! colspan="2" style="background-color: #423189;  color: #FF8800; text-align: center;" | Phoenix Suns roster
|- style="background-color: #FF8800; color: #423189;   text-align: center;"
! Players !! Coaches
|-
| valign="top" |

* – Stats with the Suns.
^ – Minimum 125 free throws made.
+ – Minimum 50 games played.

Transactions

Trades

Free agents

Additions

Subtractions

References

Phoenix Suns seasons